
Wąbrzeźno County is a unit of territorial administration and local government (powiat) in Kuyavian-Pomeranian Voivodeship, north-central Poland. It came into being on January 1, 1999, as a result of the Polish local government reforms passed in 1998.

As of 2019 its total population is 34,297, out of which the population of Wąbrzeźno is 13,570 and the rural population is 20,727.

Neighbouring counties
Wąbrzeźno County is bordered by Grudziądz County to the north, Brodnica County to the east, Golub-Dobrzyń County to the south, Toruń County to the south-west, and Chełmno County to the west.

Administrative division
The county is subdivided into five gminas (one urban and four rural). These are listed in the following table, in descending order of population.

References

 
Land counties of Kuyavian-Pomeranian Voivodeship